Ironsides is a populated place located within the township of Schuylkill in Chester County, Pennsylvania.

References

Unincorporated communities in Chester County, Pennsylvania
Unincorporated communities in Pennsylvania